HD 40979 b is an extrasolar planet orbiting the star HD 40979, was detected from the Lick and Keck observatories and photometric observations at Fairborn Observatory reveal low-amplitude brightness variations in HD 40979.  It is thought to be a large gas giant planet. It was discovered in 2002 by Debra Fischer.

References

External links 
 
 

Exoplanets discovered in 2002
Giant planets
Auriga (constellation)
Exoplanets detected by radial velocity

de:HD 40979 b